João Cardoso may refer to:

João Cardoso (musician), Portuguese musician, part of Bunnyranch and Humanos
João Cardoso (footballer, born 1951), former Portuguese football player
João Cardoso de Meneses e Sousa, Baron of Paranapiacaba (1827–1915), Brazilian poet, translator, journalist, lawyer and politician
João Lucas Cardoso (born 1991), Brazilian footballer
João Cardoso (footballer, born 1997), Portuguese footballer
João Lucas Cardoso, known as Johnny Cardoso, American soccer player

See also
Estádio João Cardoso, a football stadium in Tondela, Portugal